Cyathocrinus is an extinct genus of crinoids belonging to the family Cyathocrinitidae.

It is considered related to genera like Cyathocrinites, Gissocrinus, Ichthyocrinus, Meniscocrinus, Occiducrinus.

These stationary intermediate-level epifaunal suspension feeders lived in the Permian of Australia and  Pakistan, in the Devonian of the Czech Republic, as well as in the Silurian of the Czech Republic and Sweden, from 428.2 to 254.0 Ma.

References 

Wenlock first appearances
Silurian crinoids
Devonian crinoids
Carboniferous crinoids
Permian crinoids
Permian genus extinctions
Paleozoic animals of Asia
Prehistoric crinoid genera
Cladida